Carolyn Rodriguez,  may refer to:

Carolyn I. Rodriguez, Puerto Rican scientist and researcher
Carolyn Jane Rodriguez, Minnesotan politician